Krenopelopia is a Holarctic genus of the subfamily Tanypodinae of the non-biting midge family Chironomidae.

Species

Krenopelopia alba Tokunaga, 1937
Krenopelopia amaminova Sasa, 1991
Krenopelopia binotata (Wiedemann, 1817)
Krenopelopia hudsoni Roback, 1983
Krenopelopia narda Roback, 1971
Krenopelopia nigropunctata (Sæther, 1839)
Krenopelopia yunouresia Sasa, 1989

Tanypodinae